Claude Andre Larose (born May 17, 1955 in Saint-Jean-sur-Richelieu, Quebec) is a Canadian retired professional ice hockey winger.

Career 
Larose was drafted first overall in the 1975 WHA Amateur Draft and played 252 games in the World Hockey Association (WHA) for the Cincinnati Stingers and Indianapolis Racers. 

After the dissolution of the WHA, he played 25 games for the New York Rangers of the National Hockey League. In 1983–84, he won the John B. Sollenberger Trophy for leading the AHL in scoring. He ultimately retired in 1998 after playing a few seasons for the Windsor Papetiers of the LNAH.

Career statistics

References

External links
 

1955 births
Canadian ice hockey left wingers
Cincinnati Stingers draft picks
Cincinnati Stingers players
Drummondville Rangers players
French Quebecers
Ice hockey people from Quebec
Indianapolis Racers players
Living people
New York Rangers draft picks
New York Rangers players
People from Saint-Jean-sur-Richelieu
Sherbrooke Canadiens players
Sherbrooke Castors players
World Hockey Association first-overall draft picks